A resonator ukulele or "resophonic ukulele" is a ukulele whose sound is produced by one or more spun aluminum cones (resonators) instead of the wooden soundboard (ukulele  top/face). These instruments are sometimes referred to as "Dobro ukuleles," however the term "Dobro" is currently trademarked by the Gibson Guitar Corporation.

The resonator ukulele is a descendant of the resonator guitar. The resonator guitar was originally designed to be louder than conventional acoustic guitars, which were overwhelmed by horns and percussion instruments in dance orchestras. A resonator ukulele is generally somewhat louder than a standard wooden ukulele, and has a different tone quality and distinctive appearance.

Though resonator guitars are often played flat in the lap steel guitar style, resonator ukuleles are almost exclusively played in the conventional manner.

History

National String Instrument Corporation 
The resonator guitar was developed by John Dopyera, seeking to produce a guitar that would have sufficient volume to be heard alongside brass and reed instruments. In 1927, Dopyera and Beauchamp formed the National String Instrument Corporation to manufacture resonator guitars under the brand name National, adding resonator mandolins and ukuleles to their product line within the first year.

Dobro 
In 1929, Dopyera left National to form the Dobro Manufacturing Company with his brothers Rudy, Emile, Robert and Louis, Dobro being a contraction of "Dopyera Brothers" and coincidentally meaning "good" in their native Slovak language.  This company primarily produced guitars, but also produced resonator mandolins and resonator ukuleles that employed a cone-and-spider resonator rather different than the one- and three-cone components of the Nationals. Dobro Manufacturing Company licensed designs and supplied trademarks and parts to a series of vendors such as Kay-Kraft, Harmony (Sears) and Regal. George D. Beauchamp retained control of the National String Instrument Corporation. The two companies clashed in court from 1931 until 1935, when the Dopyeras prevailed and the National-Dobro Corporation was formed. The company moved to Chicago in 1936-37. Production of all metal-bodied resonator instruments ceased following the US entry into the Second World War in 1941.

Some of the Dopyera brothers returned to making resonator guitars in 1967, but resonator ukuleles were not included in the new product line.

National Reso-Phonic Guitars 
In the late 1980s, the National brand and trademark reappeared with the formation of National Reso-Phonic Guitars in San Luis Obispo, California. The company began producing National-type resonator instruments, eventually adding resonator ukuleles to their product line. In 2007, they discontinued production of soprano scale ukuleles, focusing their production on concert scale ukuleles.

Playing 
Resonator ukuleles are an uncommon instrument, and not as intimately tied to particular styles of music as the resonator guitar.  In some cases, the resonator ukulele is used in the same contexts which would call for the use of a resonator guitar (particularly blues music), as a cultural parallel.

Styles and positions
The resonator ukulele is almost exclusively played in the standard guitar position.  One of the few major players who is an exception to this rule is James Hill, who commissioned a specialized square-neck, high-action resonator ukulele from Beltona for the express purpose of playing in the lap style.  The standard ukulele tuning (gCEA) is the most common option, with a small minority using open tunings.

Most resonator ukuleles are strung with nylon, nylgut and fluorocarbon strings, although a minority of luthiers build reso-ukuleles designed to be used with steel strings.

Varieties of resonator ukuleles

Sizes
Pre-World War II resonator ukuleles were of the soprano or concert sizes, and those sizes are still the most common type constructed today.  Tenor resonator ukuleles are produced, but are less common, while baritone resonator ukuleles are a rare custom item.

Construction

Resonator ukuleles generally utilize a "National style" single-resonator biscuit cone, although a small number (including those made by the Dobro company in the 1930s) use a bowl resonator and spider cone.  Tricone resonators, such as seen in many National resonator guitars and mandolins, are not generally used.  Note that the term "Triolian" which National applied to some models of resonator ukuleles does  not indicate that said instruments used a tricone resonator.

Since the majority of the instrument's tone is produced by the resonator rather than the body, resonator ukuleles may have bodies made of metal, fiberglass, or wood (solid or ply).  Metal bodies may be brass, aluminum or steel.  Both metal and wooden bodies are often painted, or wooden bodies may be stained or lacquered.  Metal bodies may be plated or plain, and are sometimes engraved.  Several makers also offer metal-bodied reso-ukuleles with an artificially aged or rusted surface.

Resonator instruments may have round sound holes with screens or cut f-holes at the top of the face,  or a hole cut into the side of the body angling up towards the player's face, through which the sound of the instrument issues.

Reso-Electric
Although the original aim of the resonator was increased volume, some modern instruments incorporate electric pickups, and players add pickups to non-electric instruments, and use the resonator purely for its distinctive tone.

Manufacturers

 Beltona
 Del Vecchio 
 Dobro
 Mya-Moe Ukuleles 
 National
 National Reso-Phonic
 Regal
 Johnson/Ashbury
 Pete Howlett
 Beeton
 Donmo
 Fine Resophonic
 Mélopée
 Colin Oldham 
 Stuart Wailing 
 Koki'o / Risa
 Big Rusty 
 Duane Heilman / Black Bear 
 Geoff Davis / Old Crow 
 Gretsch 
 John Morton
 Kala 
 R.E. Phillips 
 Pohaku Ukulele
 Republic Guitars 
 Wailua Instruments

Players 
Prominent professional players of resonator ukuleles include:
 Bob Brozman
 Del Rey

See also
 Ukulele
 Banjolele
 Lap steel ukulele
 Resonator guitar

References

External links

Reso-Nation - Online Community For Reso-Enthusiasts.
Website for Resonance, a newsletter for resonator guitarists.
Comprehensive online history of National resophonic instruments

Ukuleles
Resophonic instruments